Gare d'autocars de Montréal is a bus terminal located in Montreal, Quebec, Canada. It is the departure and arrival point for most inter-city buses. Nearly 300 buses serve the terminal per day.

The station is connected to the Montreal Metro system at the Berri–UQAM station. Buses connect Montreal with many cities, mostly in Quebec, Ontario, and the state of New York.

This bus station is not to be confused with Terminus Centre-Ville which is used for public transit buses from the South Shore of Montreal, and Montreal Central Station, which serves as the Via Rail and Amtrak train station and the terminus for three of the six Exo commuter train lines.

The new bus station opened on Thursday, December 8, 2011, at the corner of Berri Street and Ontario Street. It is adjacent to the previous bus station which is located at the corner of Berri and De Maisonneuve Boulevard East. The old station was formerly known as Station Centrale d'Autobus Montréal, and Terminus Voyageur before that, back when Voyageur Colonial Bus Lines was the station's major tenant.

Intercity coaches 

Megabus (operating permit held by Trentway-Wagar, a subsidiary of Coach Canada) is the only carrier not using the station. Instead, all departures and arrivals are at 997 Rue Saint-Antoine Ouest, on the premises of 1000 de La Gauchetière and adjacent to Terminus Centre-Ville.

Société de transport de Montréal 
STM buses serve the station through adjacent bus stops. Starting January 9, 2023, the airport-bound 747 bus departs from Gate 15 of the bus terminal.

See also 
 Gare du Palais
 Ottawa Central Station

References

External links 
 

Buildings and structures in Montreal
Bus stations in Quebec
Transport in Montreal
Quartier Latin, Montreal
Transport infrastructure completed in 1951
1951 establishments in Quebec